The David Steinberg Show is the title of two separate shows which featured stand-up comedian David Steinberg.

The David Steinberg Show (1972)

The first iteration of The David Steinberg Show ran on CBS television in the United States for five weeks in the summer of 1972.  This series was an hour-long sketch comedy show, in which Steinberg was the only regular. Other sketch roles were played by the two or three guest stars Steinberg would introduce each week.

The David Steinberg Show (1976)

Four years later, Steinberg starred in a comedy/variety series also called The David Steinberg Show, which was produced in Canada for the CTV Network and was seen in the US in syndication. The series ran during 1976-77 television season, and lasted 24 episodes. This series was partly modelled on The Jack Benny Program, in that it was largely about the behind-the-scenes adventures of the cast of a variety show and their friends. Each episode included material from the "variety show" that was being produced, as well as backstage segments. Most of the episodes were released on a 3-disc DVD set and Amazon Prime Video but 3 episodes, "Phyllis Diller", "Elliott Gould" and "Richard Pryor", were not on included on either and a further episode, "Norm Crosby", is not on Amazon.

Supporting Cast
The supporting cast featured a number of people who would go on to greater fame on SCTV, and many Steinberg cast members were, in fact, simultaneously working on the first season of SCTV, which debuted the same week as The David Steinberg Show.  SCTV cast members doing "double duty" on Steinberg included Joe Flaherty, Dave Thomas and John Candy. Martin Short, also a Steinberg regular, would later become a cast member of SCTV, but not until 1982.  (Amusingly, after he joined SCTV, Short would actually end up portraying Steinberg in an SCTV sketch.)

SCTV stalwart Andrea Martin also appeared in a few episodes of The David Steinberg Show, but not as a regular.

The cast of the 1976-77 edition of The David Steinberg Show were:

David Steinberg as himself, the genial but beleaguered host of a variety show. 
Bill Saluga as Vinnie DeMilo and as Ray J. Johnson.  Vinnie is the owner of the nearby "Hello Deli", and David's chief confidante.  The cigar-chomping Ray J. Johnson, a separate character, occasionally drops by the show (but never the deli) to interrupt David's monologues with his own rambling observations.
Trudy Young as Margie, the friendly Hello Deli waitress.
John Candy as Spider Reichman, the wide-eyed, hippie-ish bandleader.  Candy also provided the voice of Vinnie's cook, who is frequently heard in the offstage Hello Deli kitchen, but is never seen onscreen.
Joe Flaherty as Kirk Dirkman, a deliveryman who rather improbably becomes a network executive overseeing David's show. 
Martin Short as Johnny Del Bravo, David's obnoxious, narcissistic, talent-free cousin who is the "featured singer" on the show.
Dave Thomas as James MacGregor, the show's excitable Scottish security guard.
Blue as Bambi Markowitz, David's ditzy, incompetent secretary/assistant.

Episode air dates and Special Guests

References

External links
 

1976 Canadian television series debuts
1977 Canadian television series endings
CTV Television Network original programming
1970s Canadian comedy television series
1970s sitcoms